Ride This Night (Swedish:Rid i natt) is a Swedish historical novel by Vilhelm Moberg which was first published in 1941. The novel is set in the Seventeenth century, portraying Sweden as being occupied by the Germans. The novel helped to encourage anti-Nazi sentiment in neutral Sweden by drawing a parallel with Germany's occupation of much of Europe during the Second World War.

Adaptations
In 1942 the novel was made into a film entitled Ride Tonight! directed by Gustaf Molander and starring Lars Hanson, Oscar Ljung and Gerd Hagman. Moberg adapted his own novel for the screenplay. In 1985 the novel was turned into a miniseries Ride This Night.

References

Bibliography
 Winkel, Roel Vande & Welch, David. Cinema and the Swastika: The International Expansion of the Third Reich. Palgrave MacMillan, 2011.

1941 Swedish novels
Novels set in the 17th century
Novels set in Sweden
Novels by Vilhelm Moberg
Swedish novels adapted into films
Swedish-language novels